David Letham (7 May 1922 – 17 March 2007) was a Scottish football player and administrator.

Playing career 

Letham played as a wing half for Queen's Park, making 98 appearances in the Scottish Football League.

Letham was also a member of the Great Britain squad at the 1948 Summer Olympics.

Administration career 

After retiring as a player, Letham became President of both Queen's Park and the Scottish Football League.

References

1922 births
2007 deaths
Scottish footballers
Queen's Park F.C. players
Scottish Football League players
Footballers at the 1948 Summer Olympics
Olympic footballers of Great Britain
Scotland amateur international footballers
Association football midfielders